The 1984 eruption of Mauna Loa was a Hawaiian eruption in the U.S. state of Hawaii that lasted from March 25 to April 15, 1984. It ended a 9-year period of quiescence at the volcano and continued for 22 days, during which time lava flows and lava fountains issued from the summit caldera and fissures along the northeast and southwest rift zones. Although the lava threatened Hilo, the flow stopped before reaching the outskirts of town.

Precursors
Repeated deformation measurements showed that the summit area of Mauna Loa began to inflate shortly after a brief summit eruption on July 5–6,  1975. The earthquakes reached a maximum frequency just after a 6.6 magnitude earthquake took place beneath the southeast flank of Mauna Loa, in the Ka‘ōiki fault system, on November 16, 1983. Following the Ka‘ōiki earthquake, the number of earthquakes over 1.5 magnitude increased gradually as the time of eruption approached.

The immediate precursors to the 1984 eruption consisted of an abrupt increase in small earthquakes and volcanic tremor recorded on seismic stations located near Moku‘āweoweo caldera. At 10:55 p.m. on March 24, small earthquakes began at a rate of 2–3 per minute. By 11:30 p.m., the seismic background increased, marking the onset of tremor. Just before 1:00 a.m. on March 25, the tremor amplitude increased to the point that the astronomical telescopes on Mauna Kea,  to the northwest, could not be stabilized due to the constant ground vibration.

Eruption

At 1:25 a.m., a military satellite recorded a strong infrared signal from the summit of Mauna Loa, indicating that the eruption was underway. Within just a few minutes, people throughout Hawaii island were reporting an intense red glow above the volcano. Eruptive fissures migrated rapidly down the southwest rift zone to the  elevation and across the southern half of Moku‘āweoweo (flow A on map). By 4:00 a.m., lava fountains extended across the northeast half of Moku‘āweoweo and into the upper reaches of the northeast rift zone (flow B on map).

At 4:41 p.m., a new fissure opened up at the  elevation. Eventually the fissure system condensed to four centers of activity with fountains up to 50 m (165 ft) high. All vents uprift from these new ones quickly became inactive and the eruptive activity was confined to these vents for the next three weeks. Six large vent structures eventually formed in this area around the active vents. By daybreak on March 26, these vents were feeding lava to a fast-moving flow (flow E on map) that had advanced  to the northeast and three less active, shorter flows (flows D on map) that were advancing east toward Kulani Prison. These flows, however, stopped advancing within 48 hours and never crossed the Powerline Road.

The fast-moving flow (flow E on map) advanced as a relatively narrow, channelized ‘a‘ā lava flow. Smoke from burning vegetation, loud explosions caused by methane gas along the advancing flow front and the intense glow at night all contributed to a growing concern among Hilo's residents.

Early in the morning of March 29, a levee along the lava channel broke at the  elevation about  upslope from the flow front (flow E on map). The lava was diverted into a new subparallel flow (flow F on map) and flow E stagnated, temporarily relieving emergency-response officials and residents of Hilo. This new ‘a‘ā lava flow moved at a comparable rate to the earlier flow E, yet did not extend beyond flow E until April 4.

Another significant levee breakout occurred on April 5, forming a third subparallel ‘a‘ā lava flow (flow G on map) that moved downslope. Concurrently, lava output at the source vents diminished slightly, and the lava became more viscous, resulting in channel blockages and levee collapses that occurred more frequently. The collapses restricted the supply of lava to the flow fronts, which moved steadily higher and more distant from the outskirts of Hilo.

References

External links

Geochemistry of the 1984 Mauna Loa Eruption: Implications for magma storage and supply
The 1984 eruption of Mauna Loa Volcano, Hawaii
Report on Mauna Loa (United States) — March 1984

Mauna Loa
20th-century volcanic events
1984 in Hawaii
VEI-0 eruptions
Volcanic eruptions in the United States
Hawaiian eruptions